Grace Maria Fernandes Mendonça (born 17 October 1968 in Januária) is a Brazilian lawyer, university professor and former Attorney General of Brazil, appointed by president Michel Temer after the resignation of Fábio Medina Osório.

Biography
Mendonça obtained a Bachelor's degree in Law, specialising in Civil Procedural Law from the Unified Teaching Association of the Federal District and a Master's Degree in Constitutional Law.

Prior joining the AGU, she was the advisor to the Deputy Attorney General of the Republic from 1995 to 2001 and a lawyer at the Companhia Imobiliária de Brasilia (TERRACAP). She was a member of Attorney General of the Union (AGU) board of directors since 2001. In 2002, she served as the Deputy Attorney General and General Coordinator of the Office of the Advocate General of the Union. She was also a senior lecturer in Constitutional Law, Civil Procedure and Administrative Law at the Universidade Católica de Brasília between 2002 and 2015.

Career 
She is to attend the WHO conference in Geneva, Switzerland.

References

1968 births
Living people
Brazilian Social Democracy Party politicians
20th-century Brazilian lawyers
Ministers of Justice of Brazil
21st-century Brazilian lawyers
Brazilian women lawyers
Attorneys General of Brazil